Lough Sheever is a small lake near Mullingar, County Westmeath, Ireland. It is located off the Castlepollard road about 3 kilometers from Mullingar. The lake is popular with anglers, (coarse fishing) for roach, perch, tench, etc. Boat hire is available.

See also
List of loughs in Ireland

Lakes of County Westmeath